The Russian presidential aircraft are aircraft of the Russian presidential fleet used by the President of Russia and other government officials. The presidential fleet is operated by Rossiya Airlines.

The main presidential aircraft is the four-engined, long-range, widebody Ilyushin Il-96-300PU, a highly modified Il-96, with the two last letters standing for "Command Point" in Russian. Five modified Il-96s have been used as presidential aircraft, the first one was used by the first President of Russia, Boris Yeltsin. In 2005, the second PUM aircraft was used by President Vladimir Putin. In 2010, the third president, Dmitry Medvedev, announced that he wanted to expand the presidential fleet with two more PUM1 aircraft, manufactured by the Voronezh Aircraft Plant. The aircraft were delivered in 2012 and 2014. Previously the president had used Ilyushin Il-62, Tupolev Tu-154, and Yakovlev Yak-40 aircraft. One more PUM1 (registration number RA-96022) was delivered in July 2016.

Description
The aircraft is a highly customized version of the standard Il-96, with extensive modifications for luxury and safety, including advanced communications systems and laser anti-missile protection.

Exterior and interior designs
The presidential aircraft uses the same color scheme as standard Rossiya aircraft, except for the use of the coat of arms of Russia or the Presidential Standard on the empennage instead of the standard flag of Russia.

The interiors of the aircraft are inspired by Russian art. It was reported that Vladimir Putin had personally inspected the ongoing work at the Voronezh plant while he was the Prime Minister.

Replacement aircraft
In May 2010, it was reported that the first new Russian airliner, the Sukhoi Superjet 100, could be used as the Russian presidential airplane in the future. However, the actual impact of these reports is unknown, and as of June 16th 2021, the President continues using the Il-96 aircraft.

See also
Air transports of heads of state and government

References

External links

Russian President’s Jet Goes Online, Kommersant, Jan'07
Putin awaits his 'Air Force One', BBC, May'02
Firm to refit Putin's plane, BBC, Sep'01
Archived version of an official page from www.kremlin.ru explaining about Russian presidential aircraft.

Presidential aircraft
Soviet and Russian civil aircraft
Russian civil aircraft
Aircraft